The Orokaiva are a people indigenous to Papua New Guinea.  In 1930, they were reported as being speakers of Binandere and divided into three groups: the Umo-ke ("River People"); the Eva-Embo ("the Salt-Water People"); and the Pereho ("the Inland People").

The Orokaiva occupied what is now Oro Province and the periphery of the area they inhabited was marked by the Owen Stanley Range in the south, German New Guinea in the west, and the Hydrographers Range in the south.
The people of Orokaiva have traditionally stories that some of their ancestors were giants. These can be proven by traditional artifacts of the past kept by knowledge keepers and modern generations of Orokaiva people. The stone axes, spears and arm bands are not normal sizes but giant sizes.
These people are great Warriors and fighters who battle and won many traditional wars to protect their land.

Rites of passage
The rite of passage through which a child becomes an adult in Orokaiva society is largely exceptional among the peoples of Papua New Guinea, involving both girls and boys. It begins with masked figures, dressed in bird feathers and pigs' tusks and representing ancestral spirits, entering the village as if on a hunt, and herding up the children who are to go through initiation. The figures shout out "Bite, bite, bite," and physically assault pigs, trees and children, before taking the children away by force to a platform that is very much like that used for killing pigs, in a symbolic killing of the children. They then take the children into the forest, where the children are left, blindfolded, in an isolated hut, in silence - and they are then told that they have now become the spirits of the dead. In the hut they are told the symbolism of the different feathers and the nature of sacred dances. Following this, they return to their village, this time acting as hunters, just as their captors had originally done.

References

Indigenous peoples of Melanesia
Ethnic groups in Papua New Guinea
Kokoda